Juncus macrophyllus is a species of rush known by the common name longleaf rush.

It is native to the southwestern United States and Baja California, where it grows in wet spots in several types of local habitat, such as chaparral.

Description
Juncus macrophyllus is a rhizomatous perennial herb forming tufts of stems up to one meter tall. The inflorescence is an open array of many clusters of a few flowers each. The flower has several segments each about 5 millimeters long.

External links
Calflora Database: Juncus macrophyllus (long leaved rush)
Jepson Manual eFlora (TJM2) treatment of Juncus macrophyllus
UC Photos gallery — Juncus macrophyllus

macrophyllus
Flora of California
Flora of Arizona
Flora of Baja California
Flora of the California desert regions
Natural history of the California chaparral and woodlands
Natural history of the Mojave Desert
Natural history of the Peninsular Ranges
Natural history of the Santa Monica Mountains
Natural history of the Transverse Ranges
Plants described in 1902
Flora without expected TNC conservation status